Johan Ulfstjerna may refer to: 

 Johan Ulfstjerna, a 1907 play by Tor Hedberg
 Johan Ulfstjerna (1923 film), a silent Swedish film adaptation directed by John W. Brunius
 Johan Ulfstjerna (1936 film), a Swedish film adaptation directed by Gustaf Edgren